Polygonum bellardii, the narrowleaf knotweed, is a species of annual herb in the family Polygonaceae. They have a self-supporting growth form and simple, broad leaves. They are native to Southern Europe, West Asia and North Africa. Individuals can grow to 0.49 m.

Sources

References 

bellardii
Flora of Europe
Flora of Western Asia
Flora of North Africa